Krasnoyarsky District is an administrative and municipal district (raion), one of the eleven in Astrakhan Oblast, Russia. It is located in the southeast of the oblast. Its administrative center is the rural locality (a selo) of Krasny Yar. As of the 2010 Census, the total population of the district was 35,615, with the population of Krasny Yar accounting for 33.2% of that number.

History
The district was established in July 1925.

References

Notes

Sources



Districts of Astrakhan Oblast
States and territories established in 1925